Leslie Allen and Mima Jaušovec were the defending champions but they competed with different partners that year, Allen with Chris Evert-Lloyd and Jaušovec with Betsy Nagelsen.

Jaušovec and Nagelsen lost in the quarterfinals to Hana Mandlíková and Virginia Ruzici.

Allen and Evert-Lloyd lost in the semifinals to Mandlíková and Ruzici.

Rosalyn Fairbank and Candy Reynolds won in the final 6–4, 6–2 against Mandlíková and Ruzici.

Seeds
Champion seeds are indicated in bold text while text in italics indicates the round in which those seeds were eliminated.

Draw

Final

Top half

Bottom half

External links
 1983 Lipton WTA Championships Doubles Draw

Doubles